Peter Daniel Ploszek (born January 20, 1987) is an American actor best known for his role as Leonardo in the Teenage Mutant Ninja Turtles films. He is also known for his role as Garrett Douglas on the MTV supernatural drama series Teen Wolf.

Life and career

Ploszek was born in Hinsdale, Illinois and graduated from St. Charles East High School. In 2009, he graduated from Princeton University, where he was a four-year member of the Princeton Tigers football team. He graduated with a MFA in Acting from the USC School of Dramatic Arts in 2012.

In 2013, Ploszek was cast as Leonardo in the reboot of the Teenage Mutant Ninja Turtles franchise. However, prior to the film's release, his voice work was dubbed over by actor Johnny Knoxville. Ploszek voiced Leonardo in the sequel to the 2016 film, Teenage Mutant Ninja Turtles: Out of the Shadows.

In 2016, he published his first book, "Get Fast and Crush the Combine".

Filmography

Film

Television

References

External links
 

American male actors
1987 births
Living people
People from Hinsdale, Illinois
Princeton University alumni
Princeton Tigers football players
USC School of Dramatic Arts alumni
American people of Polish descent